Xu Qing (born September 27, 1992) is a Chinese Paralympic swimmer. He lost both his arms in a car accident when he was 6 and began swimming training at 7, introduced to the sport by a doctor who had himself been a para-athlete.

Competing in the S6 classification, Xu won 3 gold and one bronze medal at the 2008 Summer Paralympics and 4 gold medals at the 2012 Summer Paralympics. , Xu holds S6 World records in 50 m freestyle and 50 m butterfly events; he also swam in the 2008 Chinese relay team that holds the 4 x 50 m medley 20pts World Record.

References

External links
 http://www.paralympic.org/athlete/qing-xu

Paralympic swimmers of China
Swimmers at the 2012 Summer Paralympics
Swimmers at the 2008 Summer Paralympics
Paralympic gold medalists for China
Paralympic silver medalists for China
Living people
World record holders in paralympic swimming
1992 births
Place of birth missing (living people)
Swimmers from Henan
Medalists at the 2008 Summer Paralympics
Medalists at the 2012 Summer Paralympics
S6-classified Paralympic swimmers
Paralympic bronze medalists for China
Chinese male butterfly swimmers
Chinese male freestyle swimmers
Chinese male medley swimmers
People from Pingdingshan
Medalists at the 2016 Summer Paralympics
Medalists at the World Para Swimming Championships
Paralympic medalists in swimming
21st-century Chinese people